Giuseppe Sibilli (born 7 August 1996) is an Italian professional footballer who plays as a forward for Serie B club Pisa.

Career

Early career
Sibilli began his career at hometown club FC Sant'Agnello before moving on to Siracusa. In his sole season with the club, Sibilli found the net five times in 29 appearances as the club secured promotion to Serie C, then known as Lega Pro. In August 2016, Sibilli signed a three-year contract with Catania. After just over half a season with Catania, Sibilli moved to Serie D club Sicula Leonzio, signing a short-term contract until the end of the 2016–17 season.

AlbinoLeffe
In July 2017, Sibilli signed with Serie C club U.C. AlbinoLeffe. He made his league debut for the club on 27 August 2017, coming on as a 62nd-minute substitute for Mario Ravasio in a 1–0 away defeat to F.C. Südtirol. It took Sibilli nearly a year and a half to score his first goal in a league match, a 60th minute go ahead goal in an eventual 2–2 draw with Teramo in November 2018.

Pisa
On 23 August 2020, he signed a 3-year contract with Pisa.

References

External links

1996 births
Living people
Siracusa Calcio players
Catania S.S.D. players
A.S.D. Sicula Leonzio players
U.C. AlbinoLeffe players
Pisa S.C. players
Serie C players
Serie D players
Italian footballers
Association football forwards